Pesquería Municipality is a municipality of the state of Nuevo León in Mexico. It is part of the suburban area of the Monterrey Metropolitan area. To the east of Pesquería is Los Ramones, to the north is Doctor González, to the west are Apodaca and General Mariano Escobedo International Airport, and to the south is Cadereyta Jiménez, all of which are in Nuevo León.

The river Pesquería flows through the region.

Demographics

Korean community 
The creation of a new automotive plant by KIA has led to an influx of Korean immigrants and workers to the area. Colloquially, Pesquería has even been referred to as "Pescorea", a portmanteau of Pesquería and the Spanish name for Korea, Corea.

Economy 
The most important economic activities in the Pesqueria County are cattle-breeding (about 20,000 hectares) and agriculture (about 10,000 hectares).

Suitable clay deposits enabled founding of some works producing bricks and tiles of good quality for local consumption as well as for export.

An automotive plant was built by the Korean KIA Motors company in 2016 for a planned production of 300,000 cars yearly.

References 

Municipalities of Nuevo León